Alway is a suburb of Newport, Wales, UK

Alway may also refer to:

People
 Renee Alway (born 1986) U.S. model
 Richard Alway, Canadian educator and religious layman
 Robert Alway (1790-1840) Upper Canada politician
 James Alway Ross (1869-1945) Canadian politician

See also

 
 Allway (disambiguation)
 Always (disambiguation)
 Elway (disambiguation)
 Way (disambiguation)
 All (disambiguation)
 Al (disambiguation)